The Ministry of Justice of the People's Republic of China is a government ministry under the State Council of China which is responsible for legal affairs. The range of responsibilities include judicial process, drafting legislation, developing legal framework, participating in national and international treaties, prosecution and sentencing.

The ministry also ensure in the maintenance and improvement of China's system of law and justice and its national security.

Administration 
The executive head of the ministry is the Minister of Justice. This position is equivalent to Attorney General in other countries.

Organizational structure

Agencies 
The  (司法部监狱管理局) operates national prisons in China. As of 2015, Liu Zhenyu (刘振宇) is the head of the department.

List of Justice Ministers

See also 
 
 Ministry of Justice of the Republic of China
 Chinese law
 Court system of the People's Republic of China
 Judicial system of China
 Law of the People's Republic of China
 Law enforcement in the People's Republic of China
 Legal Daily
 Legal history of China
 Legislative system of the People's Republic of China
 Ministries of the People's Republic of China
 National Judicial Exam

References

External links 
 Ministry of Justice 
 Ministry of Justice Official English website at 中国普法网
  Ministry of Justice Official English website at 中国普法网 (Archive)

Justice
Legal organizations based in China
China
Ministries established in 1949